Talkh Chikher JSC is a manufacturer of food industry in Mongolia, produces bread, pastries, candies, and biscuits in Mongolia.  It is the largest manufacturer of bread in Mongolia, producing half of the country's consumption. It has been operating for 34 years. The company produces and sells a variety of products including 20 different types of bread, 30 types of pastries, 10 types of sweet and solid cookies, 2 types of soft candy, marmalade and 10 sorts of chocolate assortments.

References 

Food and drink companies of Mongolia
Food and drink companies established in 1984
Companies based in Ulaanbaatar